Loves of Three Queens, also known as The Face That Launched a Thousand Ships, is a 1954 Italian anthology film. It was directed by Marc Allégret and Edgar G. Ulmer and stars Hedy Lamarr.

Plot

A woman going to a costume party tries to work out which Queen she will dress up as. The film follows scenes from the lives of each of the queens. Genevieve, Josephine, and Helen.

Cast 
 Hedy Lamarr as Hedy Windsor / Helen of Troy / Empress Joséphine / Genevieve of Brabant 
 Massimo Serato as Pâris
 Alba Arnova as Vénus
 Elli Parvo as Junon 
 Cathy O'Donnell  as Enone
 Cesare Danova  as Count Siegfried
 Terence Morgan  as  Golo
 Gérard Oury  as Napoleon
 Milly Vitale as  Marie-Louise
 Richard O'Sullivan as  Benoni
 John Fraser as  Drago 
 Piero Pastore as  Simon
 Enrico Glori  as Priam
 Robert Beatty  as Ménélas 
 Anna Amendola  as Minerve 
 Guido Celano  as Jupiter

Production
The film had its genesis in a proposed television anthology series called Great Loves.  Inspired by her success in Samson and Delilah, Hedy Lamarr and Victor Pahlen intended to produce the series about the love affairs of famous women throughout history.  The episodes were to be directed by Edgar G. Ulmer who had collaborated with Hedy Lamarr in her production of The Strange Woman.  The runaway production series was to consist of 39 half hour episodes photographed in colour with exteriors to be filmed on Continental European locations using frozen profits of American film producers. Star Hedy Lamarr was to be costumed by Haute couture fashion houses such as Jacques Fath and Dior.

When the television series idea was shelved, three of the teleplays were put together as the film to be shot in Italy.  The original director Edgar G. Ulmer had multiple disputes with Hedy Lamarr and walked off the film.

References

External links

Loves of Three Queens at TCMDB
 

Italian anthology films
1950s Italian films